Zhanyi Airport is a former civilian airport and military air base, located about  southeast of Zhanyi, Yunnan Province in the People’s Republic of China.

History
During World War II, the airport was known as Chanyi (Changyi) Airfield and was used by the United States Army Air Forces Fourteenth Air Force as part of the China Defensive Campaign.   The airport primarily was a reconnaissance base, with photo mapping and combat aerial photography units flying combat mapping and photo flights over Japanese-held territory from September 1944 until September 1945.   In addition, some B-25 Mitchell medium bomber and C-47 Skytrain transport aircraft used the airport.   The Americans closed their facilities at the airport in early October 1945.

Incidents
On October 29, 1940, the Chungking was strafed by Japanese fighters after it landed. Of the 9 passengers and 3 crew, 7 passengers and 2 crew died.

References

 Maurer, Maurer. Air Force Combat Units Of World War II. Maxwell Air Force Base, Alabama: Office of Air Force History, 1983. 
 Airfields & Seaplane Anchorages China
 USAFHRA search Chanyi

External links

Airfields of the United States Army Air Forces in China
Airports in Yunnan
Transport in Qujing